The Kilgore Braves were an East Texas League baseball team based in Kilgore, Texas that existed in 1936. They went 45-106 in their only year of existence, finishing in eighth place in the standings. 

Notable players include Harry Boyles, Ray Cunningham, Bubba Floyd, Dick Stone, Oad Swigart and Bennie Warren.

References

Defunct minor league baseball teams
Defunct baseball teams in Texas
Baseball teams established in 1936
Baseball teams disestablished in 1936
1936 establishments in Texas
1936 disestablishments in Texas
Gregg County, Texas
Rusk County, Texas
East Texas League teams